"My Friend The Wind" is a song by Greek singer Demis Roussos. It was released as a single in 1973.

The song was included on Roussos' 1973 album Forever and Ever.

Background and writing 
The song was written by  Alec R. Costandinos and Stélios Vlavianós. The recording was produced by Demis Roussos.

There is also a Spanish-language version, titled "Mi amigo el viento".

Commercial performance 
The song reached no. 1 in the Netherlands and Belgium (Flanders).

Track listings 
7" single Philips 6009 388 (1973, Germany)
7" single RTB / Philips S 53.713 (1973, Yugoslavia)
 A. "My Friend The Wind" (3:58)
 B. "Lay It Down" (3:45)

7" single Philips 6009 416 (1973, Netherlands)
 A. "My Friend The Wind" (3:54)
 B. "Someday Somewhere" (3:06)

7" single  Philips 6042 468 (1979, Austria)
 A. "My Friend The Wind" (3:50)
 B. "My Reason" (3:59)

Charts

Weekly charts

Year-end charts

Covers
Engelbert Humperdinck covered the song on his 1974 covers album also titles My Friend the Wind on Decca Records.

See also 
 List of Dutch Top 40 number-one singles of 1973

References 

1973 songs
1973 singles
Demis Roussos songs
Philips Records singles
Dutch Top 40 number-one singles
Ultratop 50 Singles (Flanders) number-one singles
Songs written by Alec R. Costandinos
Song recordings produced by Demis Roussos
Songs written by Stélios Vlavianós